Oscar Obert  (1931 – June 24, 2016) was an American one, three, and four wall National Handball Champion.

Obert won 42 open national and world titles (which includes twenty open USHA national titles), more than any other player in the history of the sport.  Oscar Obert, together with his younger brothers Carl and Ruby, were dominant players in the mid-1950s through to the mid-1960s, winning 92 open national and world titles, including consecutive championships in the early 1960s in both singles and doubles.

Obert was inducted into the Handball Hall of Fame in 1972.

Sources
 Hinckley, David 2003  "Hand and Ball", New York Daily News 
 United States Handball Association

1931 births
2016 deaths
American male handball players